Ischnocampa mamona is a moth of the family Erebidae. It was described by Paul Dognin in 1892. It is found in Ecuador.

References

 Natural History Museum Lepidoptera generic names catalog

Ischnocampa
Moths described in 1892